Antonius Cornelis "Ton" Lutz (17 June 1919, in Delft – 3 May 2009, in Amsterdam) was a Dutch actor and artistic leader. His two younger brothers, Luc and Pieter, were also actors, as well as his nephew Joris Lutz. He was married to actress Ann Hasekamp.

Twice, in 1968 and 1983, he was awarded the Louis d'Or, the Dutch prize for the best Dutch actor of the year. In later years, 1993–2002, he appeared mostly in television productions.

Life
After finishing high school, Lutz worked as a reporter for the Nieuwe Delftse Courant newspaper in Delft, where eventually he found himself assigned to write the theater reviews. During World War II he tried join the repertoire group at the Royal Theatre in The Hague, known as the Residentie Tooneel, but was rejected.  Instead, he was accepted for training at the Amsterdam Theatre School in 1944, but the program was shut down by the war.

After liberation Lutz went to work as a radio announcer in Groningen. Subsequently he worked as an actor for various theatre companies, including the Nederlands Volkstoneel (Dutch People's Theatre), Toneelgroep Comedia (Theatre Comedia), De Nederlandse Comedie (The Dutch Comédie), the Rotterdam Theatre, Zuidelijk Toneel Globe (Southern Globe Theatre) and the Publiekstheater (Public's Theatre).

Awards
1963 Louis d'Or
1983 Louis d'Or
1984 Lutz was knighted by the Dutch crown into the Order of Orange-Nassau.

References

External links

1919 births
2009 deaths
Dutch male stage actors
Dutch theatre directors
Dutch male voice actors
People from Delft